Grant Freckelton is a visual effects artist, art director and production designer who is most known for his work on Moulin Rouge! (2001), 300 (2006) and The Matrix Reloaded (2003). He also worked as the art director on Legend of the Guardians: The Owls of Ga'Hoole and production designer on The Lego Movie and The Lego Batman Movie.

References

Visual effects artists
Art directors
Production designers
Living people
Year of birth missing (living people)